The Kauai elepaio (Chasiempis sclateri) is a monarch flycatcher found on the Hawaiian Island of Kauai.  It numbered 40,000 around 1970, but declined by half in the 1990s. Whether this fluctuation is natural and thus the birds' numbers will rebound or whether it signifies a novel threat remains to be seen. However, it seems the birds are making a recovery, as population density on the Alakai plateau has increased by 13% in recent years.

Taxonomy and systematics

The Kauai elepaio was formerly considered as a subspecies of the Hawaii elepaio (Chasiempis sandwichensis sclateri) until reclassified as a separate species in 2010.

Description
This is the most distinct elepaio; adult birds have their head and back gray, with a white supercilium, a rusty-red breast and a white underside. Young birds are uniformly rusty above and white below. Wings and tail are alike in all subspecies, but the young individuals of sclateri have the white stippling of the wings replaced by rusty coloration too.

References

External links
Species factsheet - BirdLife International

Chasiempis
Endemic birds of Hawaii
Biota of Kauai
Birds described in 1882
Taxa named by Robert Ridgway